KSLO may refer to:

 KSLO (AM), a radio station (1230 AM) licensed to serve Opelousas, Louisiana, United States
 KSLO-FM, a radio station (105.3 FM) licensed to serve Simmesport, Louisiana